Belleau is a commune in the department of Aisne in Hauts-de-France in northern France.

Population

See also
Communes of the Aisne department
Battle of Belleau Wood
The Marine Memorial
Aisne-Marne American Cemetery and Memorial
American Battle Monuments Commission

References

External links 
 

Aisne communes articles needing translation from French Wikipedia
Communes of Aisne